Student Life in Merry Springtime (German:Student sein, wenn die Veilchen blühen) is a 1931 German musical film directed by Heinz Paul and starring Franz Baumann, Anita Dorris and Fritz Alberti.

The film's sets were designed by Robert A. Dietrich.

Cast
 Franz Baumann as Gert Simmers  
 Anita Dorris as Lisbeth - seine Schwester  
 Fritz Alberti as Deren Vater  
 Fred Louis Lerch as Fred Droysen  
 Edith Schollwer as Aenne Winter  
 Else Reval as Mutter von Aenne  
 Ernst Behmer as Vater von Aenne 
 Paul Biensfeldt as Buchhalter bei Simmers  
 Karl Platen as Der Professor  
 Hans Hamm as Student Mog  
 Henry Pleß as Student  
 Willy Clever as Student  
 Paul Ceblin as Student  
 Hans Tost as Student  
 Robert Thiem as Student

References

Bibliography 
 The Film Daily Year Book of Motion Pictures. Film Daily, 1933.

External links 
 

1931 films
Films of the Weimar Republic
German musical comedy films
1931 musical comedy films
1930s German-language films
Films directed by Heinz Paul
German black-and-white films
1930s German films